Weissite is a telluride mineral, a copper telluride. Weissite has  hexagonal crystal structure. Its specific gravity is 6 and its Mohs hardness is 3. Occurrence is in Gunnison County, Colorado, Arizona and New Mexico in the United States. It is also reported from Kalgoorlie, Western Australia and  Dalarna and Värmland, Sweden.

Weissite occurs in hydrothermal deposits associated with pyrite, native tellurium, sylvanite, petzite, rickardite, native sulfur, native gold, calaverite and krennerite.

It was first described in 1927 for an occurrence in the Good Hope Mine in the  Vulcan District of Gunnison County, Colorado. It was named for mine owner Louis Weiss.

See also
Rickardite

References

 D. M. Chizhikov and V. P. Shchastlivyi, 1966, Tellurium and Tellurides, Nauka Publishing, Moscow

Copper minerals
Telluride minerals
Hexagonal minerals
Minerals in space group 191
Minerals described in 1927